Grand River Hospital is a stop on the Region of Waterloo's Ion rapid transit system. It is located in the median of King Street in Kitchener, between Pine and Mount Hope Streets, just north of its namesake, the KW Site of Grand River Hospital. It opened in 2019.

The station's feature wall consists of ceramic tiles in a solid hospital-blue. The station also features the artwork Spinal Column by Sandra Dunn about the LRT being the backbone of the local economy.

The primary access to the platform is from the crosswalk at Pine Street; secondary accesses at the west end of the platform, crossing either side of King Street, are marked as emergency exits only. 

The station is also near Kitchener-Waterloo Collegiate, a major high school, and the CTV Kitchener studios.

References

External links
 
 

Ion light rail stations
Railway stations in Kitchener, Ontario
2019 establishments in Ontario